The Peasant Party was a Polish political party, active from 1926 to 1931 in the Second Polish Republic. It was created from a faction of Polish People's Party "Wyzwolenie" of Jan Dąbski, the Agrarian Union and People's Unity. It supported the May Coup of Józef Piłsudski in 1926, but then it moved to opposition, with some politicians splitting off in protest. In 1928 it joined the Centrolew coalition. In 1931 it merged back with PSL Wyzwolenie and Polish People's Party "Piast" forming the People's Party.

1926 establishments in Poland
1931 disestablishments in Poland
Agrarian parties in Poland
Defunct socialist parties in Poland
Polish People's Party
Political parties disestablished in 1931
Political parties established in 1926